Songhwa County is a county in South Hwanghae province, North Korea.

Administrative divisions
Songhwa county is divided into 1 ŭp (town) and 10 ri (villages):

History
The area was called Kuŭlhyŏn (仇乙縣) or Kulch'ŏn (屈遷) in the Koguryŏ era. It became part of Songhwa County in 1895, and in March 1909, Songhwa County was merged with P'ungch'ŏn County. Songhwa county was recreated in the 1952 reorganisation of North Korea's administrative divisions. The northwestern section of the county was split off in 1967 to create Kwail county.

Transportation
Songhwa county is served by the Changyŏn and Ŭllyul lines of the Korean State Railway.

References

Counties of South Hwanghae